Everett Franklin Phillips (1878-1951) was an American apiculturist, scholar, and innovator in the beekeeping field.

Phillips’ interest in honey bees began during his graduate studies at the University of Pennsylvania in the early 1900s, after which he took on a position with the United States Department of Agriculture (USDA) where he spearheaded efforts to bring the U.S. beekeeping industry to modern scientific standards. Not only did this work help beekeeping practitioners and scholars, it also played a part in the 400% increase in commercial honey production that Phillips oversaw during World War I.

In 1924, Phillips joined the faculty of Cornell University as professor of apiculture. There, together with long-time friend and major U.S. apiculturist E. R. Root, he worked to establish a world-class beekeeping library.  An endowment fund started by the New York State Beekeepers’ Association, supplemented with proceeds from the Dyce Honey Patent—an innovation in the production of creamed honey patented by Elton J. Dyce, also of Cornell—made possible the purchase of new library acquisitions over the years. The E. F. Phillips Beekeeping Collection, housed at the A. R. Mann Library at Cornell University, is today one of the largest beekeeping libraries in the world, containing some of the oldest existing beekeeping treatises, complete collections of writings by famed apiculturists such as L. L. Langstroth and Moses Quinby, and apitherapist and friend Bodog F. Beck and an ever-growing number of new publications.

In 1932 professor E. F. Phillips was invited to the Soviet Union, Republic of Georgia and spent a month visiting various beekeeping and bee research establishments. E. F. Phillips paid special attention to the unique characteristics of the Apis Mellifera Caucasia (Caucasian honey bee) species - great tongue (proboscis) length and docility and was impressed with the beekeeping potential in Georgia.

Phillips and his wife Mary Geisler Phillips, continued to work at expanding the beekeeping library at Cornell until his death in 1951.

See also

 Beekeeping

References

 Morris-Knower, James P.. "Beeman of Ithaca: E. Franklin Phillips & the Phillips’ Beekeeping Collection at Cornell's Albert R. Mann Library." Bee Culture Nov (2000): 23-25.
 Caron, Dewey M.. "Dr. E. F. Phillips." EAS Meeting. University of Delaware, Aug 2002
 A beekeeping visit to the Soviet Union. By Eva Crane. Bee World 44 (2) 48 – 76 DATE: 1963

External links
 The Hive and the Honeybee Online archive of items in the Phillips Beekeeping Collection
 A Buzz About Bees Exhibit on the Phillips Beekeeping Collection, Cornell University
 Everett Franklin Phillips - A beekeeping visit to Georgia

1878 births
1951 deaths
American beekeepers
Cornell University faculty
United States Department of Agriculture officials
University of Pennsylvania alumni
Beltsville Agricultural Research Center scientists